Attila May (born 16 September 1942) is a Hungarian fencer. He competed in the team foil event at the 1968 Summer Olympics.

References

External links
 

1942 births
Living people
Hungarian male foil fencers
Olympic fencers of Hungary
Fencers at the 1968 Summer Olympics
People from Kaposvár
Sportspeople from Somogy County